Waddles Run is a  long 1st order tributary to Long Run in Ohio County, West Virginia.

Course 
Waddles Run rises in a pond about 2.5 miles northeast of Greggsville, West Virginia, in Ohio County and then flows southwest to Long Run at Greggsville.

Watershed 
Waddles Run drains  of area, receives about 40.6 in/year of precipitation, has a wetness index of 293.39, and is about 38% forested.

See also 
 List of rivers of West Virginia

References 

Rivers of Ohio County, West Virginia
Rivers of West Virginia